Swirl may refer to:
 Swirl (band), an Australian indie rock band
 Swirl (film), a 2011 Brazilian film
 Swirl (organization), a multi-ethnic organization
 Swirl 360, an American pop-rock band
 Sega Swirl, a 1999 puzzle game for the Sega Dreamcast
 Swirl (fluid dynamics), a quantity in fluid dynamics

See also
 Christopher Paul Neil (born 1975), convicted child molester also known as "Mr. Swirl"
 Tomoe, an abstract Japanese swirl-shape